Finngal Island is a small island on the central coast of British Columbia, Canada, located south of Dufferin Island. It consists of columnar basalt lava flows and is part of a volcanic group called the Milbanke Sound Group.

See also
Volcanism of Canada
Volcanism of Western Canada
List of volcanoes in Canada

References
Catalogue of Canadian volcanoes: Finngal Island

Islands of British Columbia
Central Coast of British Columbia